Tonio, Son of the Sierras is a 1925 American silent Western film directed by Ben F. Wilson and starring Wilson, Neva Gerber, Robert Walker and Ruth Royce. It is based on the novel of the same name by Charles King.

Cast
 Ben F. Wilson as Lt. Harris
 Neva Gerber as Evelyn Brower
 Robert Walker as Lt. Booth
 Chief Yowlachie as Tonio
 Jim Welch as Col. Brower
 Ruth Royce as Mrs. Bennett
 Dick Hatton as Sanchez
 Bill Patton as Henchman
 Fred Gamble as Lt. Willet
 Fay Adams as Lt. Downs
 Merrill McCormick as Soldier

References

Bibliography
 Connelly, Robert B. The Silents: Silent Feature Films, 1910-36, Volume 40, Issue 2. December Press, 1998.
 Munden, Kenneth White. The American Film Institute Catalog of Motion Pictures Produced in the United States, Part 1. University of California Press, 1997.

External links
 

1925 films
1925 Western (genre) films
1920s English-language films
American silent feature films
Silent American Western (genre) films
American black-and-white films
Films directed by Ben F. Wilson
1920s American films